Lost & Found: Hip Hop Underground Soul Classics is a double-disc album containing previously shelved albums Center of Attention, by InI, and The Original Baby Pa, by Deda. Released on October 27, 2003 on BBE Records. Both albums were recorded in 1995 and produced entirely by Pete Rock, except for five overall tracks produced either by Grap Luva or Spunk Bigga. Neither album had been officially released until this compilation came out.

Background
Both albums were recorded in 1995, and were scheduled to be released through Pete Rock's Soul Brother Records label via a distribution deal with Elektra Records. The InI single "Fakin' Jax" was released in that year and performed fairly well. Deda's song "Blah Uno" originally appeared on a live compilation released by Elektra, which also gave a catalog number for the album that was then to be called Every Man For Himself. Rock's distribution deal with Elektra fell through, and plans to release the albums were subsequently cancelled because of issues over ownership of the masters. The Life I Live did, however, find its way onto the underground market through bootlegging.

Critical reception
In its review, PopMatters wrote that "Pete Rock has no peer when it comes to the seamless graft and the spare pull of tightly cut samples with beats that boom through the basement of your speakers." The A.V. Club wrote that the compilation "affords the pleasure of listening to a production master operating at his creative apex."

Complex called Center of Attention "a lost rap classic."

INI Center of Attention

Deda The Original Baby Pa

References

External links
 Lost & Found - Hip Hop Underground Soul Classics at Discogs

Pete Rock albums
Albums recorded at Greene St. Recording
Albums produced by Pete Rock
Barely Breaking Even compilation albums
2003 compilation albums
Barely Breaking Even albums